Catrine Lavallée  (born 24 November 1995) is a Canadian freestyle skier who competes internationally.
 
She represented Canada at the 2018 Winter Olympics.

References

1995 births
Living people
Canadian female freestyle skiers 
Olympic freestyle skiers of Canada 
Freestyle skiers at the 2018 Winter Olympics